The 1932 United States presidential election in Nevada took place on November 8, 1932, as part of the 1932 United States presidential election. State voters chose three representatives, or electors, to the Electoral College, who voted for president and vice president.

Nevada was won by Governor Franklin D. Roosevelt (D–New York), running with Speaker John Nance Garner, with 69.41% of the popular vote, against incumbent President Herbert Hoover (R–California), running with Vice President Charles Curtis, with 30.59% of the popular vote.

Results

Results by county

See also
United States presidential elections in Nevada

References

Nevada
1932
1932 Nevada elections